The 2008–09 South West Peninsula League season was the second in the history of the South West Peninsula League, a football competition in England, that feeds the Premier Division of the Western Football League. The league had been formed in 2007 from the merger of the Devon County League and the South Western League, and is restricted to clubs based in Cornwall and Devon. The Premier Division of the South West Peninsula League is on the same level of the National League System as the Western League Division One.

The champions for the second season running were Bodmin Town.

Premier Division

The Premier Division featured 20 teams, increased from 18 the previous season. Two new clubs joined the league:

Newton Abbot, third-placed club in Division One East.
Wadebridge Town, champions of Division One West.

League table

Division One East
Division One East consisted of eighteen clubs, increased from seventeen the previous season.
Newton Abbot were promoted to the Premier Division and Plymstock United were transferred to Division One West, and three new clubs joined the division: Exeter Civil Service, Bovey Tracey and Royal Marines.
Galmpton United merged with Torbay Gentlemen to form Galmpton United & Torbay Gents.

Division One West
Division One West consisted of seventeen clubs, increased from sixteen the previous season.
Wadebridge Town were promoted to the Premier Division and Goonhavern Athletic left the league.
Three new clubs joined: Godolphin Atlantic, Plymstock United (transferred from Division One East) and Truro City Reserves.

References

External links
 South West Peninsula League

South West Peninsula League
10